Stephanie Louise Norton (born 18 September 2000) is a Hong Kong sailor. She competed in the Laser Radial event at the 2020 Summer Olympics.

References

External links
 

2000 births
Living people
Hong Kong female sailors (sport)
Olympic sailors of Hong Kong
Sailors at the 2020 Summer Olympics – Laser Radial
Place of birth missing (living people)